Way Out West may refer to:

Film and television
 Way Out West (1937 film), starring Laurel and Hardy
 Way Out West (1930 film), a 1930 American comedy film
 "Way Out West" (Sliders), a television episode

Music
 Way Out West (duo), an English electronic music duo from Bristol
 Way Out West (jazz group), an Australian jazz group from Melbourne
 Way Out West (festival), a three-day music festival in Gothenburg, Sweden

Albums
 Way Out West (Richard Davis album), 1980
 Way Out West (Sonny Rollins album), 1957
 Way Out West (Mae West album), 1966
 Way Out West (Way Out West album), 1997, by the above English duo
 Way Out West (Marty Stuart album), a 2017 album by Marty Stuart
 Way Out West, Italian issue of Sixteen Tons of Bluegrass, a 1966 album by Pete Stanley and Wizz Jones

Songs
 "Way Out West" (song), a 1973 song by The Dingoes
 "Way Out West", a song by The Cooper Temple Clause from See This Through and Leave
 "Way Out West", a song by Kurtis Blow from Kurtis Blow
 "Way Out West", a song by Andrew Bird's Bowl of Fire from The Swimming Hour
 "Way Out West", a song by Big Star from Radio City
 "Way Out West", a song that was featured in the 1991 film An American Tail: Fievel Goes West
 "Way Out West", a folk song by Mary McCaslin